Lance Gibson Mann (12 July 1930 – 13 March 2015) was a professional footrunner and a former Australian rules footballer in the Victorian Football League (VFL).

Footballer 
A talented wingman, Mann started his football career in Walwa, before playing with Albury Football Club in the Ovens & Murray Football League. 

He played his first senior match for the Essendon Football Club against Fitzroy at the Brunswick Street Oval on 2 June 1951 (round 6). He played in every match for the rest of the season. He played in Essendon's Grand Final 10.10 (70) loss to Geelong 11.15 (81), and was one of Essendon's best players.

Lance won the Ovens and Murray Football League Best and Fairest award, the Morris Medal in 1956 and was a member of Albury's 1956 premiership team.

He was the coach of the Essendon Reserve Grade team in 1960 and 1961.

Sprinter

1952
Trained by Pat Kennedy, aged 21, Mann won the Wangaratta Gift on Monday 28 January 1952, running off 8½ yards  in 12.1 seconds. He started the final as 5-to-4-on favourite, having been a 20/1 outsider before the first heat.

Mann was the first athlete to win the Wangaratta Gift, the Stawell Gift, and the Bendigo Gift treble in the same year. It is also significant that his Essendon team-mate, Norm McDonald, running off , ran second to Mann in the finals of both the Stawell Gift and the Bendigo Gift.

1958
On Monday, 10 March 1958, and running off 4½ yards, he ran second in the Bendigo Thousand (130 yds); the feat was all the more remarkable as Mann had broken down during his heat the year before (1957) with a thigh injury so severe that he had to be stretchered from the ground.

Footnotes

References
 Evans, S., "Sport star survives bypass, heart attacks, transplant", The Border Mail, Monday, 12 July 2010.
 Riley, M., "Footballers and the Tradition of Professional Foot-Running", Boyles Football Photos, 3 May 2013.
 Wells (Samuel Garnet Wells (1885-1972)), "Stawell Stalwarts", The Age, (Monday, 14 April 1952), p.12.

External links

 
 Lance Mann, at Boyles Football Photos.

1930 births
2015 deaths
Australian rules footballers from Albury
Albury Football Club players
Essendon Football Club players
Stawell Gift winners
Australian male sprinters